The River Ure in North Yorkshire, England  is approximately  long from its source to the point where it becomes the River Ouse.  It is the principal river of Wensleydale, which is the only major dale now named after a village rather than its river. The old name for the valley was Yoredale after the river that runs through it.

The Ure is one of many rivers and waterways that drain the Dales into the River Ouse. Tributaries of the Ure include the River Swale and the River Skell.

Name 
By 1140 it is recorded as Jor, hence Jervaulx (Jorvale) Abbey, and a little later as Yore. In Tudor times the antiquarians John Leland and William Camden used the modern form of the name.

The name probably means "the strong or swift river".  This is on the assumption that the Brittonic name of the river was Isurā, because the Roman name for Aldborough was Isurium; intervocalic s is known to have been lost in Brittonic at an early date.     This explanation connects the river name with an Indo-European root is- meaning "strong" and the names of the Isar in Germany and the Isère in France.

Course

The source of the river is Ure Head on Abbotside Common where it flows west south-west to the valley floor and then turns south. Where it reaches the A684 it turns east along Wensleydale as far as Wensley. From here it flows south-east to Jervaulx Abbey and shortly after south to Mickley. Here it returns east and then south to Ripon. A little way after Ripon it flows east again to Boroughbridge.

To the east of Boroughbridge, the Ure is joined by the River Swale.

Water levels

 Low and high water levels are average figures.

Geology

Upper Wensleydale is a high, open and remote U-shaped valley overlying Yoredale Beds. The gradient is gentle to the north end of the valley, becoming steeper further south. Glacial drumlins lie either side of the river, which is shallow but fast flowing. The river is fed from many gills cutting through woodland and predominantly sheep farmsteads. The Settle to Carlisle railway runs along the western side of the valley here.

Mid Wensleydale is made of Great Scar limestone under Yoredale beds that make up the valley sides, which are marked with stepped limestone scars. The valley floor is made from glacial drift tails and moraine. The river here is broad and gently flowing in meanders in a stony channel.  There are four tributary valleys that contribute to several waterfalls in this area.

Lower Wensleydale is a broader version of mid Wensleydale with the river gently meandering until it drops significantly at Aysgarth over the platformed waterfalls. The valley sides become increasingly wooded.

From Middleham onwards the river is a typical mid-age river and meanders in wider arcs as it flows south-east.

History

The valley has been inhabited since prehistoric times. Examples of earthworks and other artifacts from the Bronze and Iron Ages can be seen in the Dales Countryside Museum in Hawes and the Romans built a fort at Bainbridge. Place-names in the valley denote the different types of settlers, such as Angles and Norse with typical suffixes like 'ton' and "sett".

During medieval times, much of the upper dale was sheep country belonging to Middleham Castle and Jervaulx Abbey. 
In 1751, the Richmond to Lancaster Turnpike was created and originally followed the Roman road from Bainbridge. In 1795 it was diverted along the valley to Hawes and took the Widdale route, now the B6255 to Ingleton.

More recently in 1990, Aysgarth Falls was used as a location in Robin Hood, Prince of Thieves, in the scene where Robin Hood fights Little John. It also featured in the 1992 film of Wuthering Heights and the 1984 TV miniseries, A Woman of Substance.

Economy

Farming (including dairying), tourism and quarrying are the mainstays of the modern economy of the valley. The dairy at Hawes produces Wensleydale cheese. Brewing takes place in Masham at the Black Sheep and Theakston Breweries.

There are many waymarked footpaths and open countryside. The Pennine Way passes through Hawes.

Navigation 
There are locks at Milby, where a short cut bypasses the weir at Boroughbridge, and at Westwick.

Navigation to Swale Nab, at the confluence with the River Swale, was opened in January 1769 as part of the River Ouse Navigation.  Navigation to the Ripon Canal was opened in January 1772.

The Leeds and Thirsk Railway bought the navigation in January 1846.  The navigation was neglected, and the lack of dredging resulted in boats having to be loaded with less cargo. There was a brief upturn in trade in the 1860s, but the decline continued after that. By 1892, no traffic proceeded past Boroughbridge, and the North Eastern Railway took action to prevent the waterway above Boroughbridge being used.

Until 1999 the navigation authority to Swale Nab was the Linton Lock Navigation Commissioners.  The Commissioners had insufficient income to maintain the navigation, and in 1999 it was transferred to British Waterways.  The navigation authority for the whole navigation is now the Canal & River Trust.

Natural history

The differing habitats of the area have their own populations of flora such as cranesbill, bistort, pignut and buttercup. Other species that can be seen in the area are wood anemones, violets, primroses, purple orchids, cowslips and herb paris. Some plants, such as spring sandwort, have managed to grow where the lead mining took place. There are large populations of badgers, roe deer, red foxes and rabbits in the valley. Among the variety of birds that can be seen in the valley are golden plovers, curlews and oystercatchers. Fish populations along the river include: brown trout, grayling, barbel, chub, roach and perch.

Gallery

Lists

Tributaries

From the source of the river:

 Tongue Gill
 Grass Gill
 Scars Gill
 Keld Gill
 Johnston Gill
 South Lunds Sike
 Tarn gill
 Scothole Gill
 Carr Gill
 Mossdale Beck
 Cottersdale Beck
 Widdale Beck
 Hardraw beck
 Thorne Sike
 Gayle Beck
 Blackburn Sike
 Eller Beck
 Nicholl Gill
 Raygill Sike
 Grays Beck
 River Bain
 Paddock Beck
 West Mawks Sike
 Newbiggin Beck
 Craike Sike Gutter
 Sister Ings Beck
 Starra Beck
 Wanley Beck
 Gill Beck
 Eller Beck
 Low Beck
 Bishopdale/Walden Becks
 Kendall Beck
 Belden Beck/Swan River
 Mill Beck
 Wensley Beck
 Mill Beck
 Harmby/Spennithorne Becks
 River Cover
 Harker Beck
 River Burn
 Black Robin Beck
 River Skell
 River Tutt
 River Swale

Settlements

From the source of the river:

 Blades
 South Lunds
 Appersett
 Hawes
 Bainbridge
 Worton
 Woodhall
 Aysgarth
 Wensley
 Spennithorne
 Middleham
 Ulshaw Bridge
 Masham
 Mickley
 West Tanfield
 North Stainley
 Nunwick
 Hutton Conyers
 Ripon
 Roecliffe
 Boroughbridge
 Lower Dunsforth
 Aldwark

Crossings

From the source of the river:

 Green Bridge (foot)
 How Beck Bridge
 Footbridge
 Blades Footbridge
 Unnamed road
 Unnamed road
 Thwaite Bridge
 A684
 Footbridge
 A684 New Bridge
 Footbridge
 Haylands Beck, Hawes
 Footbridge
 Yore Bridge, Bainbridge
 Worton Bridge, Worton
 Footbridge
 Footbridge
 Footbridge
 Yore Bridge
 A684 Wensley Bridge
 A684 Middleham Bridge
 Ulshaw Bridge
 Footbridge
 A6108 Masham Bridge
 Footbridge
 A6108 Tanfield Bridge
 North Bridge, Ripon
 A61 Ripon By-pass
 B6265 Hewick Bridge
 A1(M)
 A168 Arrows Bridge
 Borough Bridge
 Footbridge
 Aldwark Bridge (Toll)

References

Wensleydale
Ure
Boroughbridge
1Ure